Smeat or SMEAT may refer to:
Spam (food) and other types of canned meats
Skylab Medical Experiment Altitude Test